The Young Australian of the Year Awards commenced in 1979, and recognises those aged 16 to 30 who are considered exceptional young Australians. 1993 was the only year in which an award was not given.

See also
 List of Australian of the Year Award recipients
 List of Senior Australian of the Year Award recipients
 List of Australian Local Hero Award recipients

References 

Young Australian of the Year Award recipients
Young Australian of the Year